Rock Express was a Serbian music magazine.

History
Rock Express was founded in 1997. The magazine's Editor-in-Chief was Branko Rogošić. The first issue was released in October 1997, and the last, 42nd issue was released in December 2004.

Metal Express
In January 1999, Rock Express started to publish Metal Express, dedicated to heavy metal music. Metal Express was initially released as a supplement for Rock Express, but later appeared as an independent publication. The last, 15th issue of Metal Express was released in April 2004.

Rock Express Records
In 1997, Rock Express started its own record label, Rock Express Records. The label was mostly heavy metal-oriented. Some of the artists that have been signed to Rock Express Records include:
Draconic
Kraljevski Apartman
May Result
The label also reissued albums by former Yugoslav heavy metal acts, most notably Gordi and Heller, and issued albums by foreign acts like Strapping Young Lad and Brujeria for the Serbian market.

See also
Rock Express Top 100 Yugoslav Rock Songs of All Times

References

External links
Rock Express Records at Discogs

Defunct magazines published in Serbia
Magazines established in 1997
Magazines disestablished in 2004
Monthly magazines
Music magazines published in Serbia
Serbian-language magazines
Serbian rock music